Shriekback are an English rock band formed in 1981 in Kentish Town by Barry Andrews, formerly of XTC and the League of Gentlemen (keyboards/synthesizers/vocals), and Dave Allen, formerly of Gang of Four (bass), with Carl Marsh, formerly of Out on Blue Six (guitars/vocals) soon added to the line-up. They were joined by Martyn Barker on drums in 1983. Their early music was a funk-influenced version of new wave and post-punk, later moving towards art rock and always featuring "insidiously weird vocals".

History
Shriekback was originally formed in 1981 by Barry Andrews and Dave Allen, expanding to a trio with the addition of Carl Marsh. They enjoyed some success on the dance chart on their original Y Records label, and had a string of hits on the UK Indie Chart, while their debut album, Care (1983) was picked up by Warner in the United States.  They left Y for Arista Records for 1984's Jam Science, also recruiting drummer Martyn Barker.  The album reached number 85 on the UK Albums Chart, and "Hand on my Heart" was a number 52 UK single. They recorded the 1985 album Oil and Gold on Arista (released by Island Records in the US). Marsh left Shriekback during the recording of Oil and Gold and was replaced on guitar by Mike Cozzi, with Andrews taking over lead vocals. Shriekback also left Arista and signed to Island Records for whom they recorded Big Night Music (1986), after which Allen left to rejoin Gang of Four, and Shriekback remained a collaborative centered on Andrews. Allen would also go on to play in King Swamp and The Elastic Purejoy. Marsh was also in the band Happyhead.

After another album in 1988, Go Bang!, the band split up. Andrews continued working on other projects before re-forming Shriekback in 1992, although after the single "The Bastard Sons of Enoch" and album Sacred City, there would be no further releases until Naked Apes and Pond Life (2000). Both Allen and Marsh returned to the studio to contribute to the recording of the 2003 release Having a Moment. After Having a Moment, Andrews recorded three albums for Malicious Damage (Killing Joke's original label) under the Shriekback moniker.

Shriekback are still actively producing music and released the studio album, Why Anything? Why This?, in May 2018. The same line-up of Andrews, Barker, and Marsh self-released their 15th studio album, Some Kinds of Light, on 6 December 2019; 1000 Books and Bowlahoola followed in 2021 and 2022.

Members
Other than those listed above, Shriekback members or contributors have included Luc van Acker, Linda Nevill, Emma Burnham, Brian Nevill, Pedro Ortiz, Clare Hirst, Lu Edmonds, Wendy and Sarah Partridge (from Electric Guitars), Steve Halliwell, Eve Moon, Ivan Julian, Mike Cozzi, and Jessica Palin/Jose Fina Cupido.

In other media
Film director Michael Mann was a fan of the band, and used several Shriekback songs in his films Manhunter and Band of the Hand and in his television series Miami Vice. Music composed by Shriekback is used as the theme song for the Squaring the Strange podcast hosted by Benjamin Radford and Pascual Romero. The duo selected it because of their fondness for music from the 1980s.

Discography

Studio albums
 Tench (1982)
 Care (1983), Y (UK Indie No. 7)
 Jam Science (1984), Arista (UK No. 85)
 Oil and Gold (1985), Arista
 Big Night Music (1986), Island
 Go Bang! (1988), Island
 Sacred City (1992), World Domination/Capitol
 Naked Apes and Pond Life (2000), Mauve/Mushroom
 Having a Moment (2003)
 Cormorant (2005)
 Glory Bumps (2007)
 Life in the Loading Bay (December 2010)
 Without Real String or Fish (March 2015)
 Why Anything? Why This? (May 2018)
 Some Kinds of Light (December 2019)
 1000 Books (December 2021)
 Bowlahoola (November 2022)

Compilations and live albums
 The Infinite (The Best of Shriekback) (1984), Kaz
 Evolution - Best of Shriekback Vol. 2 (1988), Kaz
 The Dancing Years (1990), Island
 Natural History - The Very Best of Shriekback (1994), Essential
 Priests and Kannibals: The Best of Shriekback (1994), Arista
 The Y Records Years (2000), Sanctuary
 Aberrations 81-84 (2001), Weatherbox
 Vicissitudes (2002) (Shriekback.com Internet-only release)
 2 Live Shows (2002)
 Live at Hatfield (2002)
 Secrets of the City (2002) (Shriekback.com Internet-only release)
 Island of the Hopeful Monsters (2015)
 Live at Park West, Chicago '87 (2016)
 Peel Sessions and Singularities (2016)
 Big Live Band 2017 (2017)
 The Elated World (2017) (album of commissioned songs)

Singles and EPs

Video albums
 Jungle of the Senses (1987) Island Visual Arts

References

External links
Shriekback homepage
The Shriekback Pages
[ Allmusic: Shriekback]
Trouser Press: Shriekback
[ Shriekback's Billboard hits]
Malicious Damage Records
Information about the Shriekback tracks used in Michael Mann's Manhunter

English post-punk music groups
English new wave musical groups
English rock music groups
British supergroups
Rock music supergroups
New wave supergroups
Musical groups established in 1981
Musical groups disestablished in 1989
Musical groups reestablished in 1992
Musical groups disestablished in 1992
Musical groups reestablished in 1999
Musical groups from the London Borough of Camden
Arista Records artists
Island Records artists
Capitol Records artists